Rautio Nunatak is a nunatak rising to about 1,000 m between Neuburg Peak and Hannah Peak near the west end of Dufek Massif, Pensacola Mountains. Named by Advisory Committee on Antarctic Names (US-ACAN) after Henry Rautio, photographer, U.S. Navy Squadron VX-6, who obtained reconnaissance photographs of the Pensacola Mountains from LC-47 aircraft on January 22, 1964.
 

Nunataks of Queen Elizabeth Land